Kolyai Rural District is a rural district (dehestan) in the Central District of Asadabad County, Hamadan Province, Iran. At the 2006 census, its population was 3,909, in 871 families. The rural district has 13 villages.

The rural district is populated by Kurds.

References 

Rural Districts of Hamadan Province
Asadabad County
Kurdish settlements in Iran